Jarocin  is a village in Nisko County, Subcarpathian Voivodeship, in south-eastern Poland. It is the seat of the gmina (administrative district) called Gmina Jarocin.

The village has a population of 1,300.

References

Jarocin